The Taking of Diest (9 June 1580) was a successful surprise assault on the town of Diest, in the Duchy of Brabant, during the Dutch Revolt.

Background
The lordship of Diest, one of the smaller towns in the Duchy of Brabant, was part of the patrimony of the House of Nassau. In 1578 the town's magistrates were called upon to accept a rebel garrison, and had instead petitioned the king's governor general, Don John of Austria, to provide a royal garrison. The town, strategically located at the crossroads of the roads from Maastricht to Antwerp and from Brussels to Roermond, was accordingly garrisoned by Walloon and German soldiers serving in the Army of Flanders.

Taking of the town
Just before dawn on 9 June 1580, a small force of French infantry soldiers serving the Dutch Republic, commanded by the Spaniard Alonso Vanegas, scaled the walls and killed the sentries. They then opened the Zichem gate to a detachment of Dutch cavalry troopers from the garrisons of Mechelen and Herentals.

The two Walloon companies of the garrison fled, but the three companies of Germans took defensive positions on the town square and fought to the last man. In the words of one chronicler:
The three companies of Germans that were there, of the regiment of the Count of Lodron, all experienced soldiers, fought valiantly against those of the States, and with such ferocity and courage, that it was a wonder to see, by the great constancy that they showed, such that one fell dead atop another, without abandoning one another, to the last drop of blood in their bodies, so that the victory of the States was a dear one.

Aftermath
As a result of the taking of Diest, the ungarrisoned nearby towns of Aarschot and Sichem also fell under the control of the States. William of Orange, hereditary lord of Diest, fined the town 60,000 guilders for having failed to take his side in the conflict.

In 1582 a force of royal soldiers successfully scaled the town walls in an attempt to retake Diest, but they were unable to open a gate for their supporting cavalry, and after fierce fighting the survivors were taken prisoner.

References
 

Diest
Conflicts in 1580
Battles involving France
Diest
1580 in the Habsburg Netherlands
Duchy of Brabant
Eighty Years' War (1566–1609)
Taking
Diest